The 2021–22 Oklahoma State Cowboys basketball team represented Oklahoma State University during the 2021–22 NCAA Division I men's basketball season. The team was led by fifth-year head coach Mike Boynton, and played their home games at Gallagher-Iba Arena in Stillwater, Oklahoma as a member of the Big 12 Conference. 

On November 3, 2021, the NCAA ruled Oklahoma State ineligible for postseason play for the season due to player receiving improper benefits.

Previous season
In a season limited due to the ongoing COVID-19 pandemic, the Cowboys finished the 2020–21 season 21–9, 11–7 in Big 12 play to finish in fifth place. They defeated West Virginia and Baylor in the Big 12 tournament before losing to Texas in the championship game. They received an at-large bid in the NCAA tournament as the No. 4 seed in the Midwest Region where they defeated Liberty in the first round before losing to Oregon State in the second round.

Offseason

Departures

Incoming transfers

Recruiting classes

2021 recruiting class
There were no incoming recruiting class of 2021.

2022 recruiting class

Roster

Schedule and results
The Big 12 allows all 10 teams to participate in the Big 12 Tournament to determine the conference's automatic bid to the NCAA Tournament with every team being guaranteed at least one game. However, due to the Cowboys being ineligible for NCAA Tournament, they did not participate in the Big 12 Tournament.

|-
!colspan=12 style=| Exhibition

|-
!colspan=12 style=|Regular Season

References

Oklahoma State Cowboys basketball seasons
Oklahoma State Cowboys
Oklahoma State Cowboys basketball
Oklahoma State Cowboys basketball